Ɥ or ɥ refers to:
 Voiced labial–palatal approximant, a sound denoted by the  IPA character

See also
 The similar looking Cyrillic letter , Che (Cyrillic)